Kingston Maurward may refer to:

 Kingston Maurward, Dorset, a town in Dorset, U.K.
 Kingston Maurward House, a Grade I listed Georgian English country house in Dorset, U.K.
 Kingston Maurward College, Dorchester, Dorset, U.K.